Nation is a surname. Notable people with the surname include:

Bill Nation (1925–2022), American politician
Carrie Nation (1846–1911), American activist
James Nation (born 1976), New Zealand field hockey player
James Nation (born 1985), American attorney 
Paul Nation (born 1944), American-New Zealander lexicologist
Terry Nation (1930–1997), British screenwriter
Harold Turton Nation (1876–1967), assistant provincial mineralogist, namesake of Nation Peak, British Columbia